Rodolfo María Ojea Quintana is a former political prisoner from Argentina, who was detained on 9 February 1975 by military forces in Tucumán Province at the launch of what was called "Operativo Independencia". He was subjected to systematic torture with electric shock for several days until we was brought before a court. He spent six years in prison.

References

Living people
Year of birth missing (living people)